Elachista synethes is a moth of the family Elachistidae which can be found in Australia and New Zealand.

The larvae feed on a wide range of grasses, including Bromus unioloides and have also been recorded on wheat. They mine the blades of their host plant. The mine has the form of an elongate blotch mine. Full-grown larvae leave the mine to pupate in a loose cocoon.

References

Moths described in 1897
Moths of Oceania
synethes